Spa Qistina is a Malaysian television drama series broadcast by Global Station in 2010. It features Nanu Baharuddin, Fasha Sandha, Tiz Zaqyah and Faradhiya. It aired on 5 April 2010 after 13 successful episodes. This the plot centers on themes of love and treachery.

Synopsis
The story begins with the marriage of Dafi (Fazren Rafi) and Maya (Tiz Zaqyah), which is based on love and marriage filled with happiness. While the marriage of Qistina (Nanu Baharuddin) and Fahmi (Ijoy) for about two year has come under pressure because their problems are due to the age gap of 15 years between them.

While Marlia (Azizah Mahzan) and Zafrul also not happy because Marlia still do not believe Zafrul and blame Zafrul about miscarriage that she suffered. While Melissa (Nelydia Senrose) that have become well-known model is labeled happy, because his love for Aril (Kefli AF) is a new start.

Dilemma began to haunt the Dafi and Maya domestic when Julia (Faradhiya) suddenly appears to announce the news of a surprise. While Sofira (Jasmin Hamid) who has been languishing in prison received a visit of Frieda (Fasha Sandha), students who do not supposed to come looking for she in prison.

Cast

Main character
Nanu Baharuddin as Qistina
Fasha Sandha as Frieda
Tiz Zaqyah as Maya
Faradhiya as Julia

Extended cast
Azizah Mahzan as Marlia
Ijoy Azhari as Fahmi
Fazreen Rafi as Dafi
Riezman Khuzairi as Dr. Zulfadzli
Nelydia Senrose as Melissa
Jasmin Hamid as Sofiera
Kefli AF as Aril
Amyza Adnan as Kathy
Ainul Aishah as Vina
Watie Sadali as Ninie
Kencana Dewi as Sheila
Wan Raja as Tarmizi

References

Malaysian drama television series